O K was an unincorporated community located in Lincoln County, Kentucky, United States. Their post office was established in February 1882 and closed in December 1942.

References

Unincorporated communities in Lincoln County, Kentucky
Unincorporated communities in Kentucky